() is the highest rank in the Turkish Land Forces and Turkish Air Force. It is the equivalent of a Field marshal in other countries.

The rank of  can trace its origins to the Ottoman Empire, where the rank of Mushir was bestowed upon senior commanders upon order of the ruling Sultan.

The word  in Latin, had parts from the old-German words meaning horse and servant.

The rank of Mareşal can only be bestowed by the National Assembly, and only given to a general who leads an army, and/or air force with an extraordinary success in battle gaining a victory over the enemy.

List of Turkish Marshals
Only two people were bestowed the rank  to date, both for their successes in the Turkish War of Independence.

See also
 Military ranks of Turkey
 Military ranks of the Ottoman Empire
 List of field marshals of the Ottoman Empire

References

 
Military ranks of Turkey
Turkish words and phrases